The Jersey City 2004 mayoral special election took place on November 2, 2004. Democrat Jerramiah Healy won the election with 28% of the vote over his nearest rivals (Assemblyman Lou Manzo, 24%, and Acting Mayor L. Harvey Smith, 22%).  The previous Mayor Glenn Cunningham, the first African-American Mayor died of a heart attack five months prior and L. Harvey Smith became Acting Mayor. There was also an election in 2005, which Healy also won.

The election was marked by attempts to claim the legacy of deceased Mayor Cunningham, innuendo, and a picture of the eventual winner drunk and naked on his front porch.

Candidates
The candidates were as follows:

Dwayne Baskerville
Willie L. Flood
Isaiah J. Gadsden
Jerramiah Healy
Steve Lipski
Hosam Mansour
Louis Manzo
Hilario Nunez, Jr.
Alfred Marc Pine
Thomas Short
L. Harvey Smith

Results

References 

2004 New Jersey elections
Jersey City
Mayoral elections in Jersey City, New Jersey
Jersey City
Jersey City 2004